In mathematics, classical Wiener space is the collection of all continuous functions on a given domain (usually a subinterval of the real line), taking values in a metric space (usually n-dimensional Euclidean space). Classical Wiener space is useful in the study of stochastic processes whose sample paths are continuous functions. It is named after the American mathematician Norbert Wiener.

Definition

Consider E ⊆ Rn and a metric space (M, d). The classical Wiener space C(E; M) is the space of all continuous functions f : E → M. I.e. for every fixed t in E,

 as 

In almost all applications, one takes E = [0, T ] or [0, +∞) and M = Rn for some n in N. For brevity, write C for C([0, T ]; Rn); this is a vector space. Write C0 for the linear subspace consisting only of those functions that take the value zero at the infimum of the set E. Many authors refer to C0 as "classical Wiener space".

The  form another process. The Wiener measure is then the unique measure on  such that the coordinate process is a Brownian motion.

Properties of classical Wiener space

Uniform topology

The vector space C can be equipped with the uniform norm

turning it into a normed vector space (in fact a Banach space). This norm induces a metric on C in the usual way: . The topology generated by the open sets in this metric is the topology of uniform convergence on [0, T ], or the uniform topology.

Thinking of the domain [0, T ] as "time" and the range Rn as "space", an intuitive view of the uniform topology is that two functions are "close" if we can "wiggle space slightly" and get the graph of f to lie on top of the graph of g, while leaving time fixed. Contrast this with the Skorokhod topology, which allows us to "wiggle" both space and time.

Separability and completeness

With respect to the uniform metric, C is both a separable and a complete space:
 separability is a consequence of the Stone–Weierstrass theorem;
 completeness is a consequence of the fact that the uniform limit of a sequence of continuous functions is itself continuous.

Since it is both separable and complete, C is a Polish space.

Tightness in classical Wiener space

Recall that the modulus of continuity for a function f : [0, T ] → Rn is defined by

This definition makes sense even if f is not continuous, and it can be shown that f is continuous if and only if its modulus of continuity tends to zero as δ → 0:

.

By an application of the Arzelà-Ascoli theorem, one can show that a sequence  of probability measures on classical Wiener space C is tight if and only if both the following conditions are met:

 and
 for all ε > 0.

Classical Wiener measure

There is a "standard" measure on C0, known as classical Wiener measure (or simply Wiener measure). Wiener measure has (at least) two equivalent characterizations:

If one defines Brownian motion to be a Markov stochastic process B : [0, T ] × Ω → Rn, starting at the origin, with almost surely continuous paths and independent increments

then classical Wiener measure γ is the law of the process B.

Alternatively, one may use the abstract Wiener space construction, in which classical Wiener measure γ is the radonification of the canonical Gaussian cylinder set measure on the Cameron-Martin Hilbert space corresponding to C0.

Classical Wiener measure is a Gaussian measure: in particular, it is a strictly positive probability measure.

Given classical Wiener measure γ on C0, the product measure γ&hairsp;n × γ is a probability measure on C, where γ&hairsp;n denotes the standard Gaussian measure on Rn.

See also

 Abstract Wiener space
 Skorokhod space, a generalization of classical Wiener space, which allows functions to be discontinuous
 Wiener process

References 

Measure theory
Metric geometry
Stochastic processes